The 2019 Lebanese Super Cup was the 20th Lebanese Super Cup, an annual football match played between the winners of the previous season's Lebanese Premier League and Lebanese FA Cup. As Ahed won both competitions in 2019, their opponents were the 2018–19 Lebanese Premier League runners-up, Ansar.

The match was played at the Saida Municipal Stadium on 15 September 2019. Ahed defended the trophy they won in 2018, winning 2–1 thanks to an Ahmed Akaïchi brace.

Match

Summary
Ansar opened the scoring in the 24th minute after Ahed defender Khalil Khamis scored in his own net after a cross from Hassan Chaito "Shibriko". In the 26th minute, Ahed equalized the score through Tunisian forward Ahmed Akaichi after a cross by Mohamed Haidar bounced off by Abdallah Taleb. Ahed took the lead through a second goal by Ahmed Akaichi in the 42nd minute after a great individual effort, where he passed all the players who faced him and sent the ball towards the right corner of the goal, scoring the second goal for him and his team.

Details

References 

Lebanese Super Cup
Super Cup
Super Cup
Super Cup
2010s in Sidon
2019 in Lebanese sport 
Super Cup